Cybianthus is a genus of shrubs and trees in the family Primulaceae. It is native to North and South America.

Taxonomy 
Cybianthus contains 161 recognized species, including:
 Cybianthus comperuvianus
 Cybianthus gigantophyllus
 Cybianthus pastensis
 Cybianthus peruvianus

References 

Primulaceae genera
Primulaceae